

Colors with shades and tints of that hue

Black

Black is the darkest shade, and the result of the absence or complete absorption of light. Like white and gray, it is an achromatic color, literally a color without hue.

Blue

Blue is a color, the perception of which is evoked by light having a spectrum dominated by energy with a wavelength of roughly 440–490 nm. It is considered one of the additive primary colors.

Brown

Brown colors are dark or muted shades of reds, oranges, and yellows on the RGB and CMYK color schemes. In practice, browns are created by mixing two complementary colors from the RYB color scheme (combining all three primary colors). In theory, such combinations should produce black, but produce brown because most commercially available blue pigments tend to be comparatively weaker; the stronger red and yellow colors prevail, thus creating the following tones. The color brown can also be made if multiple paint colors are added to each other.

Cyan

Cyan is any of the colors in the blue-green range of the visible spectrum, i.e., between approximately 490 and 520 nm. It is considered one of the main subtractive primary colors. Cyan is sometimes considered green or blue because of the way it appears.

Gray

Achromatic grays are colors between black and white with no hue. Chromatic grays are achromatic grays mixed with warm hues such as yellow (warm grays) or cool hues such as azure (cool grays). This gray color template includes both achromatic and chromatic grays.

Green

Green is a color, the perception of which is evoked by light having a spectrum dominated by energy with a wavelength of roughly 520–570 nm. It is considered one of the additive primary colors.

Magenta

Magenta is variously defined as a purplish-red, reddish-purple, or a mauvish–crimson color. On color wheels of the RGB and CMY color models, it is located midway between red and blue, opposite green. Complements of magenta are evoked by light having a spectrum dominated by energy with a wavelength of roughly 500–530 nm. It is considered one of the subtractive primary colors.

Orange

Orange is the color in the visible spectrum between red and yellow with a wavelength around 585 – 620 nm. In the HSV color space, it has a hue of around 30°.

Pink

Pink is any of a number of similar colors evoked by light, consisting predominantly of a combination of both the longest and shortest wavelengths discernible by the human eye, in the wavelength ranges of roughly 625–750 nm and 380-490 nm.

Purple

Violet refers to any colour perceptually evoked by light with a predominant wavelength of roughly 380–450 nm. Tones of violet tending towards the blue are called indigo. Purple colors are colors that are various blends of violet or blue light with red light.

Red

Red is any of a number of similar colors evoked by light, consisting predominantly of the longest wavelengths discernible by the human eye, in the wavelength range of roughly 625–750 nm. It is considered one of the additive primary colors.

White

White is a balanced combination of all the colors of the visible light spectrum, or of a pair of complementary colors, or of three or more colors, such as additive primary colors. It is a neutral or achromatic (without color) color, like black and gray.

Yellow

Yellow is the color of light with wavelengths predominantly in the range of roughly 570–580 nm. In the HSV color space, it has a hue of around 60°. It is considered one of the subtractive primary colors.

See also

 Basic Color Terms: Their Universality and Evolution (book)
 Color blindness
 Colors of the rainbow
 Eye color
 Index of color-related articles
 List of colors: A–F
 List of colors: G–M
 List of colors: N–Z
 List of color palettes
 List of colors (compact)
 List of Crayola crayon colors
 Pantone colors
 Pigments
 Primary color
 Secondary color
 Tertiary color
 Tincture (heraldry)
 X11 color names
 Web colors

References

 
colors, shade